Gita Ramaswamy is an Indian social activist and writer.

Career 
Ramaswamy became a grass-roots organizer and activist for women's rights and the rights of the poor while a student. She co-founded the Hyderabad Book Trust, a non-profit Telugu publishing collective. She has published books in both English and Telugu, as the sole author of India Stinking (2005), and as co-author of Taking Charge of Our Bodies (2004), On Their Own (2005), and The Oxford India Anthology of Telugu Dalit Writing (2016). 

She has also translated Devulapalli Krishnamurthi’s autobiography Ooru, Vaada, Batuku into English as Life in Anantharam (2016). She also published an anthology of Gauri Lankesh’s writings in Telugu.

Works
 Jeena Hai To Marna Seekho: The Life and Times of George Reddy
 The Oxford India Anthology of Telugu Dalit Writing 
 Here I Am and Other Stories (translation, original by P. Sathyavati)
 Life in Anantharam (translation, original by Devulapalli Krishnamurti)
 Taking Charge of Our Bodies: A Health Handbook for Women (with Veena Shatrugna)
 On their own: a socio-legal investigation of inter-country adoption in India
 India Stinking: Manual Scavengers in Andhra Pradesh
 The child and the law
 Women and law
 The Lambadas: a community besieged: a study on the relinquishment of Lambada girl babies in South Telangana
 Nenu Communistuni (Telugu), Biography of C.K.Narayanareddy
 Maakoddii candaalam (Telugu)

References

External links
Hyderabad Book Trust

Indian women writers
English-language writers from India
Telugu writers
Indian translators
Indian publishers (people)
Indian social workers
People from Hyderabad, India
Living people
Year of birth missing (living people)
Telugu–English translators
Ashoka Fellows